Benedict (Benedikt) de Caché (c.a. 1740 – after 1809) was an Austrian diplomat. Austrian representative in Poland from 1782 to 1794. He returned to then-partitioned Poland in 1808.

1740 births
1809 deaths
Ambassadors of Austria to Poland